Rodakove is an urban-type settlement in Alchevsk Raion of Luhansk Oblast in eastern Ukraine. Population:

Demographics
Native language distribution as of the Ukrainian Census of 2001:
 Ukrainian: 40.37%
 Russian: 57.54%
 Others 0.06%

References

Urban-type settlements in Alchevsk Raion